Statistics of the Turkish First Football League for the 1974–75 season.

Overview
It was contested by 16 teams, and Fenerbahçe S.K. won the championship.

League table

Results

References
 Turkey - List of final tables (RSSSF)

Süper Lig seasons
1974–75 in Turkish football
Turkey